The signalling lymphocyte activation molecule family (SLAMF) is a group of cell surface receptors that modulates the activation and differentiation of a wide array of cell types involved in both innate and adaptive immune responses.

References

Further reading

Receptors